Year 1305 (MCCCV) was a common year starting on Friday (link will display the full calendar) of the Julian calendar.

Events 
 By place 

 Byzantine Empire 
 April 30 – Co-Emperor Michael IX (Palaiologos) invites Roger de Flor, Italian nobleman and adventurer, to Adrianople and has him assassinated there. Along with de Flor, 300 horsemen and some 1,000 foot soldiers who accompanied him are killed. The plan is executed by Alan mercenaries, who at that time are enlisted in the Byzantine army. The murder of the commander of the Catalan Company does not have the expected results. Not only is the Company not disbanded, but its attacks on Byzantine territory becomes more severe. The period of destruction in Macedonia and Thrace after the murder of de Flor becomes known as the "Catalan Revenge". 
 July – Battle of Apros: Byzantine forces (some 6,000 men) under Michael IX (Palaiologos), consisting of a large contingent of Alans and Turcopoles (Christianized Turks), attack the Catalan Company near Apros. Michael orders a general cavalry charge, but the Turcopoles desert en block to the Catalans. During the battle, the Byzantines are defeated (with many losses from the crossbowmen) and Michael is injured but escapes the field.

 Europe 
 June 21 – King Wenceslaus II dies, at the age of 33, probably of tuberculosis, after a 5-year reign in Prague. He is succeeded by his 14-year-old son, Wenceslaus III, who becomes ruler of Hungary, Bohemia, and Poland. He marries Viola Elizabeth (or of Teschen), daughter of Duke Mieszko I, and abandons his claim to Hungary in favour of Otto III of Bavaria on October 9. Meanwhile, Władysław I (the Elbow-High), claimant to the Polish throne, begins conquering Polish territories.Williams, Hywel (2005). Cassell's Chronology of World History, p. 154. London: Weidenfeld & Nicolson. .
 October – Albert I, king of Germany, forces the Bohemian nobles to elect his 23-year-old son, Rudolf of Habsburg, as the ruler of Bohemia on the death of Wenceslaus II.

 England 
 August 5 – William Wallace, Scottish rebel leader and knight, is captured by English troops led by John de Menteith. He is transported to London and led, crowned mockingly with laurel, in procession to Westminster Hall. The judgement, like the trial (which last for almost three weeks), is a formality, and Wallace is condemned for treason and for atrocities against civilians in war. After the trial, he is dragged through the streets of Smithfield and executed on August 23. Wallace is hanged, drawn and quartered – strangled by hanging – but cut down while still alive, emasculated, disemboweled (with his bowels burned before him), beheaded, and then cut into four parts. Wallace's head is placed on a spike above the London Bridge, and his limbs are displayed separately, in Newcastle, Berwick, Stirling, and Perth.
 September – King Edward I (Longshanks) issues ordinances for the government of Scotland. He issues the first commission of Trailbaston – which empowers him to appoint judicial commissions to punish crimes (such as homicide, theft, arson, and rape) and certain trespasses. Edward adds also conspiracy to the list of presentments.

 Asia 
 December 20 – Battle of Amroha: Mongol forces (some 30,000 men) invade the Delhi Sultanate again in northern India. Sultan Alauddin Khalji dispatches a cavalry force led by Vizier Ghazi Malik, to repulse the Mongols. During the battle (somewhere in the Amroha district), the Delhi forces inflict a crushing defeat upon the invaders. Many Mongols are taken prisoner and incorporated into the Delhi army.

 By topic 

 Religion 
 June 5 – Clement V, formerly archbishop of Bordeaux, succeeds Pope Benedict XI as the 195th pope of the Catholic Church (until 1314).

Births 
 June 2 – Abu Sa'id Bahadur (or Abu Sa'id), Mongol ruler (d. 1335)
 August 18 – Ashikaga Takauji, Japanese general (shogun) (d. 1358)
 September 25 – Al-Mahdi Ali, Yemeni imam and politician (d. 1372)
 September 29 – Henry XIV, German nobleman and co-ruler (d. 1339)
 October 28 – Minbyauk Thihapate, Burmese ruler of Sagaing (d. 1364)
 November 5 – Robert Clifford, English nobleman and knight (d. 1344)
 Agnes of Bohemia, Bohemian princess (House of Přemyslid) (d. 1337)
 Arnoul d'Audrehem, French nobleman, knight and marshal (d. 1370) 
 Elizabeth of Poland, queen consort of Hungary and Croatia (d. 1380)
 Gao Ming (or Gao Zecheng), Chinese poet and playwright (d. 1370)
 Isabella of Aragon (or Elisabeth), German queen consort (d. 1330)
 Khatsun Namkha Lekpa Gyaltsen, Tibetan religious leader (d. 1343)
 Konoe Mototsugu, Japanese nobleman (kugyō) and regent (d. 1354)
 Louis the Junker, German nobleman, knight and co-ruler (d. 1345)
 Peter of Aragon, Spanish prince (infante) and counsellor (d. 1381)
 Peter Thomas, French monk, archbishop and theologian (d. 1366)
 Philippe de Cabassoles, French bishop and papal legate (d. 1372)
 Shiba Takatsune, Japanese general and warlord (daimyo) (d. 1367)
 Thomas of Frignano, Italian cardinal and Minister General (d. 1381)
 Yi Ja-heung, Korean nobleman, official and Grand Prince (d. 1371)

Deaths 
 January 17 – Roger of Lauria, Italian nobleman and admiral (b. 1245)
 March 1 – Blanche of France, French princess and duchess (b. 1278)
 March 7 – Guy of Dampierre, French nobleman and knight (b. 1226)
 April 2 – Joan I of Navarre, French queen consort and regent (b. 1273)
 April 10 – Joachim Piccolomini, Italian monk and altar server (b. 1258)
 April 30 – Roger de Flor, Italian nobleman and adventurer (b. 1267)
 May 17 – Hōjō Tokimura, Japanese nobleman (rensho) (b. 1242)
 June 21 – Wenceslaus II, king of Bohemia and Poland (b. 1271)
 August 23 – William Wallace, Scottish rebel leader and knight
 August 26 – Walter of Winterburn, English cardinal and writer
 September 4 – Matteo Rosso Orsini, Italian cardinal (b. 1230)
 September 10 – Nicholas of Tolentino, Italian friar and mystic
 October 4 
 Dietrich VII, German nobleman and knight (b. 1256)
 Kameyama, Japanese emperor and priest (b. 1249)
 October 9 – Robert de Pontigny, French abbot and cardinal 
 November 11 – Otto I, German nobleman and knight (b. 1262)
 November 18 – John II, French nobleman and knight (b. 1239)
 November 24 – Mahalakadeva (or Mahlak Deva), Indian ruler
 Guillaume de Villaret, French knight and Grand Master (b. 1235)
 John I, Piedmontese nobleman (House of Aleramici) (b. 1275)
 John II van Sierck (or Zyrick), Dutch archdeacon and bishop 
 Qian Xuan (or Shun Ju), Chinese official and painter (b. 1235)

References